Debbie Hughes (born May 14, 1958 in Lexington, Kentucky) is an American artist specializing in science fiction and fantasy illustration. Her work has appeared in over 150 publications.

Early career
Hughes is the granddaughter of Hildegarde Hamilton, an impressionist painter, well known in the U.S and Europe. Hughes received her BA from Furman University.  Her first published cover was for Science Fiction Chronicle.  Her next book covers appeared on Baen Books in 1989 which included covers for Roger Zelazny, Aline Boucher Kaplan and Don Wismer. This was followed by frontispiece work for Easton Press/MBI books which included illustration for such authors as Alexei Panshin, Sir Kingsley Amis, Charles Pellegrino, Mike Resnick, Allen Steel, Gentry Lee, Sheri S. Tepper, Spider Robinson, and Jack McDevitt.

Hughes did interior color illustrations for Amazing Stories Magazine, Science Fiction Age Magazine and Realms of Fantasy Magazine. She created interior illustrations for Ben Bova, Martha Soukup, A.J. Austin, Vivian Vande Velde, Deborah Wheeler, Gary W. Herring, and Joyce K. Jensen.
In her work for a CD Rom Company: The Bookworm, Hughes illustrated the entire book Little Women with over 45 illustrations. She illustrated the works of Edgar Allan Poe with 12 illustrations, Nathaniel Hawthorne's The Scarlet Letter with seven illustrations and Mary Shelley's Frankenstein with 10 illustrations. From 1992 to 1994, Hughes did illustration work for Cyberflix, a local game company in Knoxville, TN. Cyberflix also signed on with Paramount Interactive and as a result Debbie worked for both companies. She worked on the CD Rom titles: Title JumpRaven, Viper and Dust. She went on to work for The Bookworm and The Learning Company. At the Learning Company she illustrated for numerous Language learning CD titles and she also worked on the Title: Reader Rabbit.

Games, cards and software
Hughes' work has been seen in the CD Rom games JumpRaven and Dust.  The Bookworm's Illustrated Classic Series, The Learning Company's Learn to Speak Series, and Reader Rabbit feature her artwork. She also created animation work for Dust, Reader Rabbit and the Bookworm's Illustrated Classic Series.

Her collectible game card work includes illustrations for Wizards of the Coast, Thunder Castle Games, DragonStorm Games, Gatekeeper Press, Mayfair Games, Companion Games, Last Unicorn Games, Five Rings Publishing, Precedence Entertainment, and Iron Crown Enterprises.

Recent work
Debbie's work "Dark Streets" is featured in Neither Beginnings nor Endings, The JordanCon 2022 Anthology.

Debbie's work was featured in the 2020 December issue of Utopia Magazine where she was interviewed by the Editor Tristan Evarts. This is a very in depth interview with many of Debbie's published and unpublished works. 

Debbie's work was featured in the 2019 Yandex - Museum of the Future (Russian Magazine)

Hughes' recent work includes 2011 ASFA Journal cover,  the frontispiece illustration for Spider Robinson's newest novel, Very Hard Choices, published by Easton Press; the frontispiece illustration for Sheri S. Tepper's novel The Margarets, published by Easton Press, a full color wrap around illustration for Nancy Farmer's Sea of Trolls, published by Editorial Presenca, Portugal and a full color wrap around cover illustration for the Postscripts Cover, Spring issue 6, 2006, P & S Publishing, UK.

The book Ruins Metropolis by Eric T. Reynolds (editor) is the third volume in the Ruins series from Hadley Rille Books. It is a collection of 35 fantasy and science fiction stories based on Hughes' art work.

Hughes has been the artist guest of honor at many conventions in the North and Southeast United States.  She is listed in the 2009 edition of Science Fiction and Fantasy Artists of the Twentieth Century written by Jane Frank. Her work has been exhibited in galleries across the United States.

Honors
Debbie received The Bernadette Award for her work: "Impedance in Slumber" from The National Association of Women Artists 132nd Annual Exhibition. This was held at One Art Space, 23 Warren Street(Tribeca)NY. NY. Oct. 16-23 2021.
Debbie' work, "Seasons of Wither won an Honorable Mention with The National Association of Women Artists exhibit: "Grand Visions, we are here", September 2020. This was held at the Grand Central Library, NYPL, 135 East 46th Street, New York, NY 10017.

Debbie received the Chesley Award from the Association of Science Fiction & Fantasy Artists (ASFA) October 2020.Category: Unpublished Color Art work for her painting: "The Raven, the Wolf and the Maiden".

On November 14, 2019 Debbie was inducted into the National Association of Women Artists which is the oldest women's fine art organization in the country. Debbie joins a list of distinguished American women artists.

References

1958 births
Living people
Artists from Lexington, Kentucky
People from Knoxville, Tennessee
American women illustrators
American illustrators
Science fiction artists
Kentucky women artists
21st-century American women